Yao's Millionaires' problem is a secure multi-party computation problem introduced in 1982 by computer scientist and computational theorist Andrew Yao. The problem discusses two millionaires, Alice and Bob, who are interested in knowing which of them is richer without revealing their actual wealth.

The Millionaires' problem is an important problem in cryptography, the solution of which is used in e-commerce and data mining. Commercial applications sometimes have to compare numbers that are confidential and whose security is important.

Many solutions have been introduced for the problem. The first solution, presented by Yao, is exponential in time and space.

Protocols and proof

The protocol of Hsiao-Ying Lin and Wen-Guey Tzeng 

Let  be a binary string of length n.

Then, the protocol is based on the following claim:
 Assume that a and b are binary strings of length n bits.
 Then  if the sets  and  have a common element (where a and b are the binary encodings of the corresponding integers).

The protocol of Ioannidis and Ananth

The protocol uses a variant of oblivious transfer, called 1-2 oblivious transfer. The receiver chooses , and the sender sends  with the oblivious transfer protocol such that

The protocol takes the following steps.
 Alice creates a matrix  of size  of -bit numbers, where  is the length of the key in the oblivious transfer protocol.
  will be the -th bit of the number that appears in cell  (where  indicates the least significant bit). In addition,  is denoted as the -th bit of Alice's number . For every ,  Alice does the following actions.
 If , let , otherwise let  and for every  set  to a random bit.
 For  set .
 Alice sends to Bob .
Bob scans the result from left to right until he finds a large sequence of zero bits. Let  be the bit to the right of that sequence ( is non zero). If the bit to the right of  equals 1, then , otherwise .

Proof

Correctness 
K, and therefore c as well, can be split into 3 parts. The left part doesn't affect the result. The right part has all the important information, and in the middle is a sequence of zeros that separates those two parts. The length of each partition of c is linked to the security scheme.

For every i, only one of  has non-zero right part, and it is  if , and  otherwise. In the end, if , then those two leftmost bits will be 11, and Bob will answer that . If the bits are 10, then , and he will answer . If , then there will be no right part in c, and in this case the two leftmost bits in c will be 11, and will indicate the result.

Security 

The information Bob sends to Alice is secure because it is sent through oblivious transfer, which is secure.

Bob gets 3 numbers from Alice:
 .
 N. This is an XOR of random numbers, and therefore reveals no information. The relevant information is revealed only after calculating c.
 c. The same goes for c. The left part of c is random, and the right part is random as well, except for the two leftmost bits. Deducing any information from those bits requires guessing some other values, and the chance of guessing them correct is very low.

Complexity

Alice constructs d-length number for each bit of a, and Bob calculates XOR d times of d-length numbers. The communication part takes also . Therefore, the complexity of the protocol is

See also

 Cryptography
 RSA
 Secure multi-party computation
 Socialist millionaire problem, a variant in which the millionaires wish to determine whether their fortunes are equal.

References 

Theory of cryptography
1982 introductions